Evan Thomas Evans (23 July 1903 – 1982) was a Welsh professional footballer who played as a wing half in the Football League for Brentford.

Career statistics

References

People from Llanidloes
Sportspeople from Powys
Welsh footballers
Association football wing halves
Llanidloes Town F.C. players
Brentford F.C. players
English Football League players
Chatham Town F.C. players
Southern Football League players
1903 births
1982 deaths